Henry Chandler may refer to:
 Henry F. Chandler (1835–1906), American soldier and Medal of Honor recipient
 Henry P. Chandler (1880–1975), first Director of the Administrative Office of the United States Courts
 Henry Wilkins Chandler (1852–1938), First African American graduate of Bates College, Florida Senator, and lawyer
 Henry William Chandler (1828–1889), English classical scholar